Karan is the surname of the following notable people:
Abraar Karan, American global health physician and writer
Amara Karan (born 1984), British actress
Chris Karan (born 1939), Australian jazz drummer
Dejan Karan (born 1988), Serbian football player
Donna Karan (born 1948), American fashion designer
Goran Karan (born 1964), Croatian vocalist
Guilherme Karan (1957–2016), Brazilian actor
Ian Karan (born 1939), Tamil German businessman and politician
Jajati Karan (born 1973), Indian journalist
Marija Karan (born 1982), Serbian actress
Mark Karan (born 1955), American guitarist and singer
Panos Karan (born 1982), British classical pianist, conductor and composer
Pawan Karan (born 1964), Indian poet, columnist, editor and analyst
Ram Karan, Indian politician
Saška Karan (born 1964), Serbian singer
Ümit Karan (born 1976), Turkish football manager and player

See also
Karan (given name)
Karen (name), given name and surname

Serbian surnames